The Yuma Scorpions were a professional developmental baseball team based in Yuma, Arizona.  They were members of the Arizona Winter League, a short-season instructional league run by the North American League.  They are owned by Diamond Sports & Entertainment LLC and are 3-time AWL Champions.

The Scorpions played in the American Division, as well as the Arizona RoadRunners, Blythe Heat, Long Beach Armada, and Somerton Stingers.  The team has played their home games at Desert Sun Stadium in Yuma, Arizona since 2007 in the AWL and 2005 in the GBL/NAL.

Team history
The identity began with the main franchise as a charter member of the Golden Baseball League in 2005 along with the Chico Outlaws, Fullerton Flyers, Japan Samurai Bears, Long Beach Armada, Mesa Miners, San Diego Surf Dawgs and Surprise Fightin' Falcons.  The franchise had little to limited success in the GBL and a new team was formed as a part of the new developmental Arizona Winter League in 2007 with the Scorpions joining the Canada Miners and Sonora Pilots assuming new identities and the Scorpions and San Diego Surf Dawgs assuming the former GBL identities.  It proved fruitful as the team won three AWL Championships in 2007, 2009 and 2011.  Perhaps the most accomplished alumnus of the Scorpions AWL team is Sergio Romo, who was directly acquired by the San Francisco Giants without even playing a GBL game.

As for the original franchise, they joined the NAL as a charter member following the merger of the GBL and United League Baseball in 2011 and they have since been purchased from the league by Godfather Media LLC and renamed the Yuma Panthers in February 2012.

Season-by-season records
Arizona Winter League:

See also
 Yuma Panthers (NAL)

References

External links
 Yuma Scorpions website
 Arizona Winter League website
 Yuma Sun's Yuma Scorpions archive section
 A real second chance (The Arizona Daily Star, September 12, 2008)
 Saskatchewan Silver Sox vs. Yuma Scorpions 20 Feb 2010 Photos & Batting Video

Baseball teams established in 2005
Arizona Winter League teams
Professional baseball teams in Arizona
Yuma, Arizona
2005 establishments in Arizona
Defunct baseball teams in Arizona
Baseball teams disestablished in 2012